Untamed is the debut studio album of the American country music band Yankee Grey. It was released in 1999 (see 1999 in country music) on Monument Records Nashville. The album produced three chart singles on the Billboard country charts. In order of release, these were "All Things Considered" at number 8, "Another Nine Minutes" at number 15, and "This Time Around" at number 43. The fourth and final single, which was the title track, failed to chart. By 2000, Yankee Grey were dropped from Monument's roster, and frontman Tim Hunt left due to vocal complications.

Track listing

Personnel
Compiled from liner notes.
Yankee Grey
Matthew Basford – lead guitar, background vocals
David Buchanan – bass guitar, background vocals
Joe Caverlee – fiddle, background vocals
Kevin Griffin – drums, background vocals
Jerry Hughes – keyboards, background vocals
Tim Hunt – rhythm guitar, lead vocals
Additional musicians
John Catchings - cello on "This Time Around"
David Hoffner - strings
Josh Leo - additional electric guitar on "Another Nine Minutes" and "I Know How You Feel"
Robert Ellis Orrall - background vocals on "I Know How You Feel" and "All Things Considered"
Joe Perry - slide guitar on "Tell Me Something I Don't Know"
Tom Roady - percussion
Biff Watson - acoustic guitar on all tracks except "This Time Around"
Technical
Ben Fowler - engineering
Josh Leo - production (all tracks)
Robert Ellis Orrall - production (all tracks)
Ronnie Thomas - production ("All Things Considered" only), associate production, mastering
Hank Williams - mastering

Chart performance

References

1999 debut albums
Monument Records albums
Albums produced by Josh Leo
Yankee Grey albums